The 1995–96 Stanford Cardinal men's basketball team represented Stanford University as a member of the Pac-10 Conference during the 1995–96 NCAA Division I men's basketball season.  The team was led by head coach Mike Montgomery and played their home games at Maples Pavilion. Stanford finished third in the Pac-10 regular season standings and received an at-large bid to the 1996 NCAA tournament. Playing as the No. 9 seed in the East region, the Cardinal defeated No. 8 seed Bradley in the opening round before falling to No. 1 UMass in the second round for the second straight season. Stanford finished with an overall record of 20–9 (12–6 Pac-10; later adjusted to 21–8 overall and 13–5 Pac-10).

Roster

Schedule and results

|-
!colspan=12 style=| Regular season

|-
!colspan=12 style=| NCAA tournament

Schedule Source:

Rankings

References

Stanford Cardinal
Stanford Cardinal men's basketball seasons
Stanford Cardinal men's basketball
Stanford Cardinal men's basketball
Stanford